Andrei Smirnov may refer to:

 Andrei Smirnov (actor) (born 1941), Soviet Russian actor and filmmaker
 Andrey Smirnov (curler) (born 1973), Russian wheelchair curler
 Andrei Smirnov (footballer, born 1962), Russian footballer
 Andrey Smirnov (general) (1895–1941), Soviet general
 Andrei Smirnov (Gundam 00), anime character from the Gundam series
 Andrei Smirnov (ice hockey) (born 1990), professional ice hockey player
 Andrey Smirnov (swimmer) (born 1957), Soviet Olympic swimmer
 Andrei Viktorovich Smirnov (born 1980), Russian footballer for FC Khimki and FC Vityaz Podolsk
 Andrey Andreyevich Smirnov (1905–1982), Soviet ambassador to Austria

See also
 Smirnov (surname)
 Smirnoff (surname)